Ambassadors of Germany:

Current ambassadors
As of December 2021:

Permanent Representatives 
List of Permanent Representatives of Germany to NATO
Permanent Representative of Germany to the United Nations

See also
List of current ambassadors of Germany (on German Wikipedia)

References

External links

The Embassies

Lists of ambassadors by country of origin